Susan McLane (née Neidlinger) (September 28, 1929 – February 13, 2005) was an American politician.

Early life and education 
Born in Boston, Massachusetts, McLane graduated from Hanover High School in Hanover, New Hampshire in 1947. She then attended to Mount Holyoke College. In 1981, McLane returned to school and studied at the John F. Kennedy School of Government.

Career 
From 1969 to 1981, McLane served in the New Hampshire House of Representatives. In 1980, McLane unsuccessfully ran for United States Congress, competing in the Republican primary against Charles Bass and Judd Gregg. Gregg eventually won the election, and Bass was elected to congress in 1995. In 2010, Bass was defeated by McLane's daughter, Ann.

From 1981 to 1995, McLane served in the New Hampshire Senate. Originally a Republican, McLane later became an independent and a Democrat.

Personal life 
She married Malcolm McLane, a businessman and politician, and lived Concord, New Hampshire from 1952 until her death from Alzheimer's disease in 2005. McLane's daughter is Ann McLane Kuster, a congresswoman who has represented New Hampshire's 2nd congressional district since 2013.

Notes

1929 births
2005 deaths
Politicians from Boston
Politicians from Concord, New Hampshire
People from Hanover, New Hampshire
Mount Holyoke College alumni
Harvard Kennedy School alumni
Women state legislators in New Hampshire
New Hampshire Democrats
New Hampshire Independents
New Hampshire Republicans
New Hampshire state senators
Members of the New Hampshire House of Representatives
20th-century American women politicians
20th-century American politicians
McLane family of New Hampshire
21st-century American women